Salmagundi is a US quarterly periodical, featuring cultural criticism, fiction, and poetry, along with transcripts of symposia and interviews with prominent writers and intellectuals. Susan Sontag, a longtime friend of the publication, referred to it as "simply my favorite little magazine."  In The Book Wars, James Atlas writes that Salmagundi is "perhaps the country's leading journal of intellectual opinion."

History and profile
Salmagundi was founded by Robert Boyers in the fall of 1965, using money he earned as a youth, singing at his neighborhood Jewish temple, and at weddings and Bar Mitzvahs.  Boyers drew inspiration for his quarterly from other "little magazines" of the era, such as Partisan Review, F.R. Leavis's Scrutiny, and T.S. Eliot's Criterion, among others.  The title of the magazine was chosen as a reference to the 19th-century periodical of the same name, published by Washington Irving.

In 1969, the magazine moved its headquarters to Skidmore College, in Saratoga Springs, N.Y.  Boyers and his wife, Margarita "Peg" Boyers are both professors in Skidmore's English Department.  The magazine celebrated its Fiftieth Anniversary in 2015 by publishing three large volumes, featuring "Best Of" selections from Salmagundi's first five decades.

While the magazine has no explicit mission statement, Boyers has often invoked Lionel Trilling's description of the role served by little magazines in preventing the culture from "being cautious and settled, or merely sociological, or merely pious" and "to make the official representatives of literature a little uneasy."

Salmagundi's editors take pride in continually finding "ways to say NO and THINK AGAIN to the largely settled views of our own enlightened readership." Christopher Lasch, a frequent contributor to the Salmagundi until his death in 1994, observed, in 1975, that the magazine "often criticized leftist clichés from a point of view sympathetic to the underlying objectives of the left."  Lasch further noted that Salmagundi reliably opposed "fake radicalism," "genteel academicism" and "estheticism," even as it recognized "the precarious position of intellectual culture in the modern world."

One of the things that sets Salmagundi apart from other literary magazines is its commitment to hosting (and transcribing, for publication) ambitious symposia, featuring lively debate among prominent scholars and writers.  Past symposia have included figures such as, Lionel Trilling, Richard Rorty, Martha Nussbaum, Slavoj Zizek, Anthony Appiah, Orlando Patterson, Susan Sontag, and many others.

Notable columnists and contributors

Critics and scholars
Susan Sontag
George Steiner
Marilynne Robinson
Christopher Hitchens
James Miller
Tzvetan Todorov
Sir Isaiah Berlin
William H. Gass
Christopher Lasch
Adam Phillips
Phillip Lopate
Steve Fraser
Daniel Swift
Siri Hustvedt
George Scialabba

Novelists
Russell Banks
Joyce Carol Oates
J.M. Coetzee
Nadine Gordimer
Mario Vargas Llosa
Darryl Pinckney
Steve Stern
Mary Gordon
Norman Manea
Mary Gaitskill
Rick Moody
Amy Hempel
Binnie Kirschenbaum
Jim Shepard
Howard Norman

Poets
Robert Lowell
Seamus Heaney
Adrienne Rich
Robert Pinsky
Frank Bidart
Richard Howard
Marie Howe
Charles Simic
Louise Glück
Carolyn Forché
Honor Moore
Carl Dennis
Campbell McGrath
Vijay Seshadri
Rosanna Warren

Notable essays, poetry, and fiction
 Edward Said's "Beginnings" (1966)
 Howard Nemerov's "First Snow" (#22 - 23, 1973)
 Adrienne Rich's "Pieces" and "Incipience" (#22 - 23, 1973)
 Robert Lowell's "History" and "Man and Woman" (#22 - 23, 1973)
 Robert Penn Warren's "The Nature of A Mirror" (#22 - 23, 1973)
 Louise Glück's "Pomegranate" (#22 - 23, 1973)
 Leslie H. Farber's "Lying on the Couch" (1975)
 Howard Nemerov's "Ozymandias II" and "Ginkgoes in Fall" (#28, 1975) 
 Robert Lowell's "Epilogue" (#37, 1977)
 Robert Penn Warren's "Question You Must Learn to Live Past" and "What Was The Thought?" (#50 - 51, 1980–81)
 Louise Glück's "First Goodbye" (#50 - 51, 1980–81)
 William H. Gass's "The Death of the Author" (1984)
 George Steiner's "Our Homeland, the Text" (1985) 
 Seamus Heaney's "Place, Pastness, Poems: A Tryptch" (1986)
 Martin Jay's "The Descent of de Man" (1988)
 Christopher Lasch's "Counting by Tens" (1989) 
 Robert Pinsky's "Shiva And Parvati Hiding In The Rain" (#85 - 86, 1990)
 Seamus Heaney's "Seeing Things" (#88 - 89, 1990–91)
 Natalia Ginzburg's "My Psychoanalysis" (1991) [Trans. from Italian by Lynne Sharon Schwartz]
 Jed Perl's "Abstract Questions" (1992)
 Sharon Olds's "Parent Visiting Day" and "His Smell" and "The Urn" and "To My Father" (#93, 1992)
 J.M. Coetzee's "Emerging from Censorship" (1993)
 Richard Howard's "My Last Hustler" (#100, 1993)
 James Miller's "Foucault's Politics in Biographical Perspective" (1993)
 Kwame Anthony Appiah's "Ancestral Voices" (1994)
 Roger Shattuck's "Second Thoughts on a Wooden Horse" (1995)
 Tzvetan Todorov's "The Touvier Trial" (1995) [Trans. from French by John Anzalone]
 Stanley Kauffmann's "What's Left of the Center?" (1996)
 Carl Dennis's "The God Who Loves You" (#111, 1996)
 J.M. Coetzee's "Realism" (#114 - 115, 1997) [This was eventually published as a chapter in Coetzee's acclaimed novel, Elizabeth Costello]
 Michael Ondaatje's "Buried" (#113, 1997)
 Charles Molesworth's "From Collage to Combine: Rauschenberg and Visual Culture" (1998)
 David Rieff's "In Rwanda: The Crisis of Humanitarianism" (1998)
 Joyce Carol Oates's "The Aesthetics of Fear" (1998)
 Marilynne Robinson's "The Fate of Ideas: Moses" (1999)
 Carl Dennis's "Progress" (#121 - 122, 1999)
 Frank Bidart's "Luggage" and "Hammer" (#121 - 122, 1999)
 C.K. Williams's "The Nail" (#121 - 122, 1999)
 Robert Pinsky's "Porch Steps" and "Song" (#124 - 125, 1999-2000)
 Carolyn Forché's "Nocturne" (#126 - 127, 2000)
 Frank Bidart's "Pre-Existing Forms: We Fill Them and When We Fill Them We Change Them and Are Changed" (2000)
 Carl Dennis's "The Photographer" (#135 - 136, 2002)
 Richard Howard's "Knowing When To Stop" (#135 - 136, 2002)
 C.K. Williams's "Inculcations" (#137 - 138, 2003)
 Carolyn Forché's "Death Bed" and "Fisherman" (#148 - 149, 2005–06)
 Honor Moore's "Violetta, 2000" (#144 - 145, 2004–05)
 Honor Moore's "Wallace Stevens" (#146 - 147, 2005)
 Frank Bidart's "Winter Spring Summer Fall" and "God's Catastrophe in Our Time" (#148 - 149, 2005–06)
 Seamus Heaney's "The Aerodrome" (#148 - 149, 2005–06)
 Robert Pinsky's "Work Song" (#148 - 149, 2005–06)
 Adam Phillips's "On What is Fundamental" (2009)
 Phillip Lopate's "How Do You End an Essay?" (2010)
 Charles Simic's "The Invisible" (#166 - 167, 2010)
 Siri Hustvedt's "The Real Story" (2012)

See also
List of literary magazines

References

External links
 Salmagundi official site

Literary magazines published in the United States
Quarterly magazines published in the United States
Magazines established in 1965
Magazines published in New York (state)
Skidmore College
Hijacked journals